Datooyili is a community in Tamale Metropolitan District in the Northern Region of Ghana. most of its inhabitants are Dagombas.

See also
Suburbs of Tamale (Ghana) metropolis

References 

Communities in Ghana
Suburbs of Tamale, Ghana